A list of films produced by the Marathi language film industry based in Maharashtra in the year 2004.

2004 Releases
A list of Marathi films released in 2004.

References

Lists of 2004 films by country or language
 Marathi
2004